WWE Home Video is a video distribution and production company that distributes WWE programming. A division of WWE formed on April 16, 1997 as WWF Home Video, it replaced a similar independent company owned by Evart Enterprises, Coliseum Video, which operated between 1985 and 1997. 

On December 3, 2021, it was originally announced that WWE Home Video releases would be discontinued in the United States and Canada in early 2022 but that decision was reversed. However, releases in the United Kingdom by distributor Fremantle are slated to continue.

History

Coliseum Video

VHS and Betamax cassettes released by Coliseum generally fell into several categories:

"Best-of" volumes highlighting classic matches, both recent and from the company's earlier years. Many of these releases included title changes that had happened since production of the previous volume was completed.
Wrestler profiles, which encompassed the WWF careers of company wrestlers, both current and former.
Theme videos, which showcased match types. 
Each of the WWF's three major men's titles – the Heavyweight Championship, Intercontinental Championship and Tag Team Championship – had a volume dedicated to the title as it progressed from champion to champion, along with classic matches contested for the championship. 
A handful of these volumes also showcased bloopers and comedy moments, rather than strictly wrestling matches. 
Pay-per-view and other live events.

Coliseum Video released videos of the two World Bodybuilding Federation events and two non-Titan videos: the music video for the New York Giants' "We're The New York Giants" and a Wayne Gretzky instructional video, Hockey My Way.

On February 5, 2018, 38 Coliseum Videos were released on the WWE Network.

WWF/WWE Home Video

Upon the folding of Coliseum Video, videos that were being or had been released by Coliseum Video were re-released with new packaging and the WWF Home Video name and logo in 1997. When the WWF became WWE in 2002, the name of the home video subsidiary changed as well. Content released by WWE Home Video continues to release the same content as Coliseum did, and also releases content produced exclusively for home entertainment such as swimsuit videos and retrospective documentaries. Content from the World Wrestling Federation's "Attitude Era" (1998–2002), however, had to be edited due to the lawsuit that caused the WWF to become WWE. All WWF "scratch" logos and references to the initials WWF had to be blurred or edited out. However, the words "World Wrestling Federation" were not edited, and the old WWF logo was not blurred. In addition, the UK exclusive WWE Tagged Classics did not have any edits or censoring of the WWF initials. Some of the early WWE home video releases were also not edited (such as The Rock Just Bring It; the 2002 editions of Backlash and Insurrextion also featured the WWE digital on-screen graphics inserted on top on the old WWF one). Some of the videos/DVDs in question were just renamed with the WWE logo.

In 2012, the WWE and the World Wide Fund came to an agreement which allowed WWE to use the Scratch logo in past photos and videos, thus ending the blurring on 'Attitude Era' PPVs and shows; in return, the WWE is not permitted to use any WWF logos in new, original footage.

Distribution Deals

North America
Since January 2015, Warner Bros. Home Entertainment has been the distributor of WWE Home Video titles in the region. The deal also saw DVD releases coming from the defunct World Championship Wrestling, which was previously owned by Time Warner and sold to WWE in 2001. The deal came as a result of the success the two had with Scooby-Doo! WrestleMania Mystery, as well as a Flintstones crossover and a sequel to the Scooby-Doo crossover. Additionally, despite remaining top-sellers, WWE Home Video releases had been in a decline in recent years due to streaming media services such as WWE's own WWE Network.

Europe
Since January 2013, FremantleMedia (now Fremantle) has been the distributor of WWE Home Video products in a number of European countries including the United Kingdom. WWE announced  that FremantleMedia would be handling all future WWE DVD, Blu-ray, and digital-file-based releases in Europe, replacing Silver Vision. Their official UK website  launched in January 2013 along with their initial releases - Night Of Champions 2012, Hell In A Cell 2012, Top 100 RAW Moments and The Attitude Era, all of which were issued on DVD and Blu-ray.

Expansion of the video library
With the expansion of the WWE Video Library, content has also been released from the vast library archives, including classic WWF, AWA, WCW, ECW, WCCW, and NWA content.

Formats
Content has been released exclusively in the DVD and UMD format (for selected documentaries only, until the format was discontinued) since mid-2005 (SummerSlam 2005 was the last VHS release). WrestleMania XXIV is the company's first show, and the first sports related event, to be released on Blu-ray Disc, being released in stores on May 20, 2008 as a 2-disc set; it was also the only pay-per-view released on UMD. Some content (primarily pay-per-views) are also available on Video CD format through certain licensors in some developing markets.

See also
Impact Home Video

References

 
Mass media companies established in 1997
1997 establishments in Connecticut